Dirk Schulze-Makuch (born 1964) is a professor at the Center for Astronomy and Astrophysics at the Technical University Berlin, Germany and Adjunct Professor at the School of Earth and Environmental Sciences Washington State University, Pullman, WA. He is best known for his publications on extraterrestrial life, being coauthor of five books on the topic: The Cosmic Zoo: Complex Life on Many Worlds (2017), A One Way Mission to Mars: Colonizing the Red Planet (2011), We Are Not Alone: Why We Have Already Found Extraterrestrial Life (2010), Cosmic Biology: How Life could Evolve on Other Worlds (2010), and  Life in the Universe: Expectations and Constraints (2004, 2008, 2018). In 2012 he published with David Darling Megacatastrophes! Nine Strange Ways the World Could End. In 2013 he published the second edition of his science fiction novel Alien Encounter. Together with Paul Davies he proposed in 2010 exploration of Mars by a one-way trip to the planet.

Education and career
His upbringing was in Giessen, Germany, where he received his Diplom-Degree (M.S.) in Geology from Justus Liebig University in 1991. In 1996 he obtained his Ph.D. in Geosciences from the University of Wisconsin-Milwaukee. After having worked as Senior Project Hydrogeologist at Envirogen, a Princeton-based research and consulting firm, for which he investigated subsurface hydrocarbon spills, he became in 1997 Adjunct Professor at the University of Wisconsin-La Crosse. In 1998 he joined the University of Texas at El Paso as assistant professor, investigating microbe and chemical transport in groundwater, and microbial interaction in a planetary environment. From there he joined Washington State University in 2004: first as Associate Professor, since 2010 as Professor at the School of Earth and Environmental Sciences, with focus on astrobiology and planetary habitability. Since 2013 he is a professor at the Technical University Berlin (Germany) and led as Principal Investigator the European Union – funded ERC Advanced Grant project on the “Habitability of Martian Environments” from 2013 to 2019. In 2019 he has been awarded an ERC Proof of Concept Grant.

Scientific research

Schulze-Makuch's research interests and publications range from life beyond Earth, including planetary protection, hydrobiology, archeology, to cancer. To the viewer he may be best known for his work in astrobiology 
in particular the possible existence of life on Venus, Mars,
Titan,
Europa, and Io
.
With Ian Crawford he proposed that microbial life may have existed temporarily on Earth´s Moon, at a time of major volcanic outgassing about 3.5 billion years ago. His book Life in the Universe (with L. N. Irwin) and his studies consider alternative physiologies for extraterrestrial life.

Patents
Removal of Biological Pathogens Using Surfactant Modified Zeolite. Patent No. US 7,311,839 B2. Date of patent: dec. 25, 2007.

Awards
Friedrich-Wilhelm Bessel Award (2010) by the Alexander von Humboldt Foundation.

Media activity
The work of Schulze-Makuch has received much attention. It has been the subject of TV programs on the BBC, the National Geographic and the Discovery Channel, and of numerous articles in magazines such as New Scientist, The Guardian and Der Spiegel.

Blog: Air&Space Magazine: Life beyond Earth

Works

Academic books 
 Life in the Universe: Expectations and Constraints (with L.N. Irwin) (3rd ed.) (2018) 
 Life in the Universe: Expectations and Constraints (with L.N. Irwin) (2nd ed.) (2008) 
 Life in the Universe: Expectations and Constraints (with L.N. Irwin) (2004)

Popular science books 
 The Cosmic Zoo  (2017)  
 The Extraterrestrial Encyclopedia  (2nd edition, 2016) (with D. Darling)
 How To Develop The Solar System and Beyond: A Roadmap to Interstellar Space (with A. Sinclair and six more authors) (2012) ASIN B009KWNO02
 Megacatastrophes! Nine Strange Ways the World Could End (with D. Darling) (2012) 
 A One Way Mission to Mars: Colonizing the Red Planet (with P. Davies and ten more authors; J.S. Levine, editor) (2011) 
 We Are Not Alone: Why We Have Already Found Extraterrestrial Life (with D. Darling) (2010) 
 Cosmic Biology: How Life Could Evolve on Other Worlds (with L.N. Irwin) (2010)

Science fiction novel 
 Alien Encounter: A Scientific Novel (2nd ed.) (2013) 
 Voids of Eternity: Alien Encounter (2009)

References

External links
 
 

Living people
American geologists
1964 births
Washington State University faculty
Academic staff of the Technical University of Berlin
Astrobiologists
European Research Council grantees